Stainer & Bell Limited is a British music publisher, specialized in classical sheet music.

History 
Stainer & Bell was founded in 1907. In 1917, Stainer & Bell was appointed publisher of the Carnegie Edition. Stainer & Bell acquired Augener & Co. (which had previously acquired music publisher Joseph Williams, founded 1840) and Galliard.

In 1991, the company moved to Victoria House in Finchley Central.

Catalogue 
Stainer & Bell publishes a broad selection of predominantly British Music, including the following composers:
 Contemporary composers: Bertie Baigent and Philip Moore
 XXth century composers: Charles Villiers Stanford, Gustav Holst, Ralph Vaughan Williams, Hope Squire, and Herbert Howells.
 Earlier composers: Henry VIII, William Byrd, and Henry Purcell.
Percussion composers: David Hext, Jack Richards , Brian Stones, Tony Stockley, Andrew McBirnie.

See also 
 Robert Cocks & Co.

References

External links

Music publishing companies of the United Kingdom
Sheet music publishing companies
Companies based in the London Borough of Barnet
Publishing companies established in 1907